Tahrak Mahalleh (also Romanized as Ţāhrak Maḩalleh; also known as Tārīk Maḩalleh) is a village in Goli Jan Rural District, in the Central District of Tonekabon County, Mazandaran Province, Iran. At the 2006 census, its population was 131, in 31 families.

References 

Populated places in Tonekabon County